Slide Hollow (also known as Slide Hollow Run) is a tributary of Panther Run in Union County, Pennsylvania, in the United States. A total of 35 different dissolved elements have been detected in it. Wild trout also naturally reproduce within the stream and it has been stocked with trout in the past.

Course
Slide Hollow begins in a valley between Jones Mountain and Middle Ridge in Lewis Township. It flows west-southwest and almost immediately enters Hartley Township. It continues flowing west-southwest for several tenths of a mile. The stream then turns west-northwest for a short distance before turning southwest. Several tenths of a mile further downstream, it reaches its confluence with Panther Run at The Hook.

Hydrology (other than dissolved elements)
The field pH of Slide Hollow was once measured to be 6.85, while the lab pH was measured to be 6.51. The concentration of aluminum in the stream was measured to be . The concentrations of sulfate, nitrate, and chloride were 0.495, 3.548, and 1.148, respectively.

Dissolved elements

A total of 35 dissolved elements have been observed in the stream at concentrations above or at their detection limits.

The rubidium concentration was only , however. The strontium and barium concentrations were considerably lower, only .

All of the non-radioactive lanthanides were detected in the stream, with the exception of thulium and lutetium. The highest-numbered transition metal to be observed in concentrations above the detection limit was hafnium.

Geography, geology, and watershed

The stream and its valley are entirely within the United States Geological Survey quadrangle of Hartleton.

History and biology
The valley of Slide Hollow was entered into the Geographic Names Information System on August 2, 1979. Its identifier in the Geographic Names Information System is 1187806. Slide Hollow is an unofficially named stream that is named after the valley through which it flows. The stream is also known as Slide Hollow Run.

Wild trout naturally reproduce in Slide Hollow from its headwaters downstream to its mouth. In the 1930s, the stream was known to be a good brook trout stream. It was also stocked with trout during this time.

In a 2006 survey, eight fish were observed in Slide Hollow.

See also
List of rivers of Pennsylvania

References

Rivers of Union County, Pennsylvania
Tributaries of Buffalo Creek (West Branch Susquehanna River)
Rivers of Pennsylvania